Tapesia is a genus of fungi in the family Mollisiaceae. It contains 120 known species but the validity of some is doubtful.

Species

 Tapesia airae 
 Tapesia alba 
 Tapesia amoris 
 Tapesia angelicae 
 Tapesia annae 
 Tapesia apocrypta 
 Tapesia arachnoidea 
 Tapesia atrospora 
 Tapesia aurantiaca 
 Tapesia aurata 
 Tapesia avium 
 Tapesia badia 
 Tapesia balsamicola 
 Tapesia bipunctata 
 Tapesia brachycarpa 
 Tapesia brevispora 
 Tapesia bromeliacearum 
 Tapesia byssina 
 Tapesia byssiseda 
 Tapesia callunae 
 Tapesia caricina 
 Tapesia caricis-firmae 
 Tapesia carnosa 
 Tapesia carpathica 
 Tapesia caulium 
 Tapesia centaureae 
 Tapesia chlorotica 
 Tapesia cinerea 
 Tapesia cinerella 
 Tapesia citrinopigmentosa 
 Tapesia citrinopigmentosa 
 Tapesia clinopodii 
 Tapesia coloradensis 
 Tapesia conglomerata 
 Tapesia corni 
 Tapesia corticola 
 Tapesia cruenta 
 Tapesia culcitella 
 Tapesia cytisi 
 Tapesia derelicta 
 Tapesia discincola 
 Tapesia dryina 
 Tapesia epicladotricha 
 Tapesia epithelephora 
 Tapesia equiseti 
 Tapesia eriophori 
 Tapesia eryngii 
 Tapesia evilescens 
 Tapesia exigua 
 Tapesia firmula 
 Tapesia flavescens 
 Tapesia flavescens 
 Tapesia foetida 
 Tapesia frangulae 
 Tapesia fusca 
 Tapesia fuscoatra 
 Tapesia fuscohyalina 
 Tapesia gaillardii 
 Tapesia globulifera 
 Tapesia gloeocapsae 
 Tapesia griseopulveracea 
 Tapesia haloxyli 
 Tapesia hirta 
 Tapesia hypoderma 
 Tapesia intermedia 
 Tapesia jaceae 
 Tapesia laburni 
 Tapesia laricina 
 Tapesia lata 
 Tapesia lateritia 
 Tapesia legeriana 
 Tapesia lividofusca 
 Tapesia lutescens 
 Tapesia megaloma 
 Tapesia melina 
 Tapesia minima 
 Tapesia mollisioides 
 Tapesia moravica 
 Tapesia mortuaria 
 Tapesia myosotidis 
 Tapesia nigrificans 
 Tapesia occulta 
 Tapesia ochroleuca 
 Tapesia padi 
 Tapesia parvula 
 Tapesia pezizellaeformis 
 Tapesia pruni-avium 
 Tapesia prunorum 
 Tapesia pseudosanguinea 
 Tapesia pseudotapesia 
 Tapesia quercina 
 Tapesia rhois 
 Tapesia ribicola 
 Tapesia rivularis 
 Tapesia rubescens 
 Tapesia sambuci 
 Tapesia sarothamni 
 Tapesia scariosa 
 Tapesia scutelliformis 
 Tapesia secamenti 
 Tapesia stipata 
 Tapesia strobilicola 
 Tapesia subfusca 
 Tapesia subiculata 
 Tapesia succinea 
 Tapesia tenebricosa 
 Tapesia tenebrosa 
 Tapesia torulae 
 Tapesia tumefaciens 
 Tapesia ulicis 
 Tapesia umbrosa 
 Tapesia undulata 
 Tapesia vaccinii 
 Tapesia variabilispora 
 Tapesia variabilispora 
 Tapesia versatilis 
 Tapesia villosa 
 Tapesia vincta 
 Tapesia viticola 
 Tapesia zarza

References

Helotiales genera
Helotiales